Ny-Hellesund is a village area and outport in Kristiansand municipality in Agder county, Norway. The three islands are Monsøya, Helgøya, and Kapelløya. The islands formed an outport because they all have good harbors and approach conditions. Historically, it was part of the old municipality of Søgne, until 2020 when it became part of Kristiansand.

Ny-Hellesund has 21 permanent residents (in 2015), but in the summer there are many more temporary residents who live in holiday cottages, guest houses, and boathouses. There is considerable boat traffic through the main channel between the three islands: Hellesundet (Helle Strait). In addition, a large number of boaters utilize the fine harbor conditions in the large, sheltered area between the islands of Helgøya and Kapelløya.

Ny-Hellesund was from the 18th century known for its pilot station, customs station, guesthouses and fisheries. Ny-Hellesund can be regarded as one of the best preserved outports in the region. The ongoing preservation of the cultural environment here began in 2009. The MF Høllen is a ferry that travels to and from Ny-Hellesund several times each day. Ny-Hellesund is also a former shipyard, called "Verftet", which is now converted into a restaurant and guesthouse. The site is designed by artist Per Fronth.

Many Norwegian painters such as Johan Martin Nielssen and Amaldus Nielsen have portrayed Ny-Hellesund over the years.

Olavsund
Olavsund (English: Olav Strait) is the strait that runs between Kapelløya and Helgøya in the central part of Ny-Hellesund. According to legend, it was formed when Saint Olav struck with his sword against the mountain on the run from pursuers. In the narrowest part of Olavsund, it is said that it is possible to see the outline of St. Olav's face in the mountains. Legend says that St. Olav built a chapel on the island Kapelløya as a thanks to the rescue. There are some plans to rebuild the chapel using designs by Sverre Fehn.

Media gallery

Coastal fort
During World War II, the German occupying military forces built a coastal fort on Helgøya. Work began in 1942 and included Russian prisoners of war in the work. The purpose of the facility was to protect coastal traffic and the west entrance to Kristiansand.
 
The fort was originally called "Norway's little Gibraltar." The fort had a workforce of 150. To protect the fort, there were machine guns, mortars, and flame throwers. Furthermore, the fort was equipped with radar, searchlights, and smoke systems. All together there were 31 buildings there along with 26 bulletproof stone bunkers in the area.
 
The fort was abandoned in 1945 and many of the buildings were demolished and equipment and facilities were removed in an attempt to erase its memory over the following 30–40 years. In 1987, however, restoration work was begun. Several of the  M/13 Schneider guns are back in place. Fortification, trenches, roads, and tunnels in the area is secured and repaired, so the area is easily accessible.

References

Villages in Agder
Geography of Kristiansand
Populated coastal places in Norway